Margret(h)e is an alternate spelling of the feminine given name Margaret. 

People so named include:
 Margrete or Margaret I of Denmark (1353–1412), Queen of Denmark and Queen of Norway and Sweden by marriage
 Margrethe II of Denmark (born 1940), queen regnant of Denmark
 Margaret of Sweden, Queen of Norway (c. 1155–1209), in Norwegian "Margrete", queen consort of Norway
 Margaret Skulesdatter (1208–1270), in Old Norse "Margrét", queen consort of Haakon IV of Norway
 Princess Margaret of Denmark (1895–1992), in Danish "Margrethe"
 Margrete Auken (born 1945), Danish politician
 Margrete Aamot Øverland (1913–1978), journalist and member of the Norwegian Resistance during World War II 
 Margrethe Christiansen (1895–1971), Danish folk high school teacher
 Margrethe Lasson (1659–1758), first novelist in Denmark
 Margrethe Munthe (1860–1931), Norwegian teacher, children's writer, songwriter and playwright
 Margrethe Schall (1775–1852), Danish ballerina
 Margrethe Schanne (1921–2014), Danish ballerina
 Margrethe Vestager (born 1968), Danish politician

See also
 Margherita of Savoy (1851 - 1926), Queen of Italy
 Margaret of Scotland, Queen of Norway (1261 - 1283), in Old Norse "Margrét", queen consort of Norway
 Margaret Fredkulla (1080s - 1130), in Danish "Margrete", queen consort of Denmark and Norway
 Margaret Sambiria (1230? - 1282), in Danish "Margrethe", queen consort of Christoper I of Denmark and regent for Eric V of Denmark

Feminine given names
Given names derived from gemstones